In mathematics, in the field of group theory, a group is said to be strictly simple if it has no proper nontrivial ascendant subgroups.

In the finite case, a group is strictly simple if and only if it is simple. However, in the infinite case, strictly simple is a stronger property than simple.

See also
 Serial subgroup
 Absolutely simple group

References
Simple Group Encyclopedia of Mathematics, retrieved 1 January 2012

Properties of groups